WAJN-LP was a low-power television station in Brookston, Indiana, broadcasting locally on channel 43. Founded April 24, 2002, the station was owned by Jerald Nay.

On August 31, 2011, the Federal Communications Commission (FCC) cancelled the station's license due it being silent for greater than twelve months. The station's call sign was deleted from the FCC's database.

External links

Mass media in White County, Indiana
Television stations in Indiana
Television channels and stations established in 2002
Defunct television stations in the United States
Television channels and stations disestablished in 2011
2002 establishments in Indiana
2011 disestablishments in Indiana
AJN-LP